The 2017–18 Primera División Femenina de Fútbol was the 30th edition of Spain's highest women's football league. The season started on 3 September 2017 and ended on 13 May 2018.

Atlético de Madrid successfully defended their title from 2016 to 2017.

Teams

Madrid CFF and Sevilla joined the league after earning promotion at the conclusion of the 2016–17 Segunda División. They took the place of Oiartzun and Tacuense, which were relegated at the conclusion of the 2016–17 Primera División.

Stadia and locations

Personnel and sponsorship

Managerial changes

League table

Results

Season statistics

Top goalscorers

Hat-tricks

4 Player scored 4 goals
5 Player scored 5 goals

Best goalkeepers

Player of the week

Notable attendances
22,202 Atlético de Madrid 2–2 Madrid CFF (17 March 2018 at Wanda Metropolitano)
21,504 Real Sociedad 1–4 Athletic Club (13 May 2018 at Anoeta Stadium)
14,000 Levante 0–1 Valencia (28 April 2018 at Ciutat de València)
6,643 Betis 3–0 Santa Teresa (10 March 2018 at Benito Villamarín)

Transfers

References

External links
Primera División (women) at La Liga 
RFEF Official Website 

2017-18
Spa
1
women's